Insurrection is the third studio album by deathcore band Molotov Solution, released through BlkHeart Group on October 25, 2011. The record is the only Molotov Solution album to feature guitarist Richie Gomez, bassist Shane Slade and drummer Jacob Durrett.

Track listing

Credits 
Writing, performance and production credits are adapted from the album liner notes.

Molotov Solution
 Nick Arthur – vocals
 Robbie Piña – guitar
 Richie Gomez – guitar
 Shane Slade – bass
 Jacob Durrett – drums

Guest musicians
 Adam Warren (Oceano) – vocals on "The Final Hour"
 Will Putney (Fit for an Autopsy) – guitar solo on "Infernal Machine"
 Patrick Sheridan (Fit for an Autopsy) – guitar solo on "Infernal Machine"

Production
 Will Putney – production, engineering, mixing, mastering
 Randy Leboeuf – additional editing
 Alberto De Icaza – additional editing

Artwork and design
 Grindesign – Artwork

References

External links 
 

2011 albums
Molotov Solution albums
Albums produced by Will Putney